The Lunatic at Large is a 1927 American comedy film directed by Fred C. Newmeyer and  starring Leon Errol, Dorothy Mackaill and Warren Cook (his final role). Written by Ralph Spence, it is based on the 1899 novel The Lunatic at Large and its sequels The Lunatic at Large Again (1922), The Lunatic Still at Large (1923), and The Lunatic In Charge (1926) by British writer J. Storer Clouston, which had previously inspired a 1921 film of the same title. The film shifted the setting from the original's London to New York. The film was released on January 2, 1927, by First National Pictures.

Cast       
Leon Errol as Sam Smith
Dorothy Mackaill as Beatrix Staynes
Jack Raymond as Mandell Essington
Warren Cook as Dr. Wilkins
Kenneth MacKenna as William Carroll / Henry Carroll
Tom Blake as Maxwell
Charles Slattery as Lunt
Teresa Maxwell-Conover as Aunt Teddy

References

Bibliography
 Goble, Alan. The Complete Index to Literary Sources in Film. Walter de Gruyter, 1999.

External links

 

1927 films
1920s English-language films
Silent American comedy films
1927 comedy films
First National Pictures films
Films directed by Fred C. Newmeyer
American silent feature films
American black-and-white films
Films based on British novels
Films set in New York City
1920s American films